Ramona Lee Etta Barnes (née Wheeler; July 7, 1938 – November 26, 2003) was a Republican politician, who served in the Alaska House of Representatives for two periods spanning 1979–1985 and 1987–2001.

Born in Pikeville, Tennessee, Barnes went to Bledsoe County High School and Waipahu Community College. Her husband Larry Barnes was in the military. Barnes served as an undercover agent for the Central Intelligence Agency in the Philippines. Then Barnes, her husband and family moved to Anchorage in 1972. She managed a beauty shop and salon. Barnes was the president of the Arctic Research Consultants, Inc, and also served on the Elmendorf Air Force Base School Board before her election to the state House.

In 1993, Barnes served as Speaker of the House. Barnes died in an Anchorage hospital in 2003, from pneumonia caused by cancer.

See also
 List of female speakers of legislatures in the United States

Notes

External links
 Ramona Barnes at 100 Years of Alaska's Legislature
 

1938 births
2003 deaths
20th-century American businesspeople
20th-century American politicians
20th-century American women politicians
21st-century American politicians
21st-century American women politicians
Businesspeople from Anchorage, Alaska
Deaths from pneumonia in Alaska
People from Pikeville, Tennessee
Politicians from Anchorage, Alaska
School board members in Alaska
Speakers of the Alaska House of Representatives
Republican Party members of the Alaska House of Representatives
Women state legislators in Alaska